The Ministry of Regional Development of the Czech Republic is a government ministry, which was established in 1996.

External links
 

Czech Republic
Regional Development
Ministries established in 1996
1996 establishments in the Czech Republic